The iPod Classic (stylized and marketed as iPod classic and formerly iPod Video or just iPod) is a discontinued portable media player created and formerly marketed by Apple Inc.

There were six generations of the iPod Classic, as well as a spin-off (the iPod Photo) that was later re-integrated into the main iPod line. All generations used a  hard drive for storage. The "classic" suffix was formally introduced with the rollout of the sixth-generation iPod on September 5, 2007. Prior to this, all iPod Classic models were simply referred to as iPods; the first iPod released in 2001 was part of this line that would be called "Classic". It was available in silver or black from 2007 onwards, replacing the "signature iPod white".

On September 9, 2014, Apple discontinued the iPod Classic. The sixth-generation 160 GB iPod Classic was the last Apple product to use the original 30-pin dock connector and the distinctive click wheel.

Technical information

User interface

iPods with color displays use anti-aliased graphics and text, with sliding animations. All iPods have five buttons and the later generations (4th and above) have the buttons integrated into the click wheel — a design which gives an uncluttered, minimalist interface, though the circuitry contains multiple momentary button switches. The buttons are:
 Menu: to traverse backward through the menus, toggle the backlight on older iPods, and jump to the main menu on newer iPods
 Center: to select a menu item
 Play / Pause: this doubles as an off switch when held
 Skip Forward / Fast Forward
 Skip Backwards / Fast Reverse

Operating system and firmware
The iPod's operating system is stored on its dedicated storage medium. An additional NOR flash ROM chip (either 1 MB or 512 KB) contains a bootloader program that tells the device to load its OS from the storage medium. Each iPod also has 32 MB of RAM, although the 60 GB and 80 GB fifth generation, and the sixth-generation models have 64 MB. A portion of the RAM is used to hold the iPod OS loaded from firmware, but the majority of it serves to cache songs from the storage medium. For example, an iPod could spin its hard disk up once and copy approximately 30 MB of upcoming songs into RAM, thus saving power by not requiring the drive to spin up for each song. Custom firmware has also been developed such as Rockbox (up to 1G - 6G requires emCORE) and iPodLinux (up to 5G, 6G has an encrypted firmware.) which offer open-source alternatives to the standard firmware and operating system.

Additional features 
In March 2002, Apple added limited PDA-like functionality: text files can be displayed, while contacts and schedules can be viewed and synchronized with the host computer.
Some built-in games are available, including Brick (a clone of Breakout), Parachute, Solitaire, and iPod Quiz. A firmware update released in September 2006 brought some extra features to fifth-generation iPods including adjustable screen brightness, gapless playback, and downloadable games. However, as of September 30, 2011, these games are no longer available on the iTunes Store.

History

1st generation 

Apple introduced the first-generation iPod (M8541) on October 23, 2001, with the slogan "1,000 songs in your pocket". They went on sale on November 10, 2001. Among the iPod's innovations were its small size, achieved using a 1.8" hard drive, whereas other HDD-based competitors (like earlier DEC Personal Jukebox player) were using 2.5" hard drives at the time, and its easy-to-use navigation, which was controlled using a mechanical scroll wheel (unlike later iPods, which had touch-sensitive scroll wheels), a center select button, and four auxiliary buttons around the wheel. The iPod had a rated battery life of ten hours.

VCard compatibility was added, as well as allowing iPods to display business card information synced from a Mac.

2nd generation 

The second-generation of the iPod was introduced on July 17, 2002. Using a similar body style as the first generation, the top of the iPod was redesigned, switching from a single swooping cutout in the backplate to mount the FireWire port, hold switch and headphone assembly, to individual ports being cut into the backplate to allow these ports to be accessed. Furthermore, the hold switch was redesigned, a cover was added to the FireWire port, and the mechanical wheel was replaced with a touch-sensitive wheel.

Notably, the second-generation iPods and the updated first-generation iPod were now Windows-compatible. These versions came with a 4-pin to 6-pin FireWire adapter and were bundled with Musicmatch Jukebox. At that time iTunes was Mac only and unavailable for Windows.

In December 2002, Apple unveiled its first limited edition iPods, with either Madonna's, Tony Hawk's, or Beck's signature or No Doubt's band logo engraved on the back for an extra .

3rd generation

On April 29, 2003, Apple announced a completely redesigned third-generation iPod. Thinner than the previous models, the third-generation models replaced the FireWire port with a new proprietary 30-pin Dock Connector  and introduced the Touch Wheel, a completely non-mechanical interface with the four auxiliary buttons located in a row between the screen and the touch wheel. The front plate had rounded edges, and the rear casing was slightly rounded as well. A new wired remote connector was introduced. Whereas first and second-generation iPods had an auxiliary ring around the headphone port for the remote, the third-generation iPods had a 4-pin jack adjacent to the headphone port. All iPods were now compatible with Mac and Windows out of the box, simply requiring Windows users to reformat the iPod before use on a PC and both iTunes and Musicmatch Jukebox were bundled with all iPods. The battery life was reduced to 8 hours, partially due to the use of a smaller lithium-ion battery as opposed to a lithium polymer battery.

The 15 GB model was replaced by a 20 GB model and the 30 GB model was upgraded to 40 GB on September 8, 2003. The Windows-based Musicmatch Jukebox software was made obsolete and replaced by iTunes 4.1, the first version available for Microsoft Windows.

4th generation
Announced on July 19, 2004, the fourth-generation iPod replaced the touch wheel from the third-generation iPod with the Click Wheel from the iPod Mini, putting the four auxiliary buttons underneath a touch-sensitive scroll wheel. The casing was also slightly slimmer. Notably, Apple began reducing pack-in accessories starting with the fourth generation. While a dock, carrying case, and wired remote were previously included with higher-end iPods, the higher-level 40 GB iPod only came with a dock, earphones and an interchangeable proprietary cable capable of USB and FireWire interface. In addition to using the iPod Mini's Click Wheel, the fourth-generation iPod used the more energy-efficient components of the Mini, allowing the fourth-generation iPod to over 12 hours of battery life while using the same battery as its predecessor.

A special U2 edition was announced on October 26, 2004, to cross-market U2's How to Dismantle an Atomic Bomb album. The plastic front piece of the U2 edition iPod was black and the scroll wheel was red, to coincide with the color scheme of the U2 album. U2 iPod customers also received 30 minutes of exclusive U2 video downloadable from the iTunes Music Store.

A Special Harry Potter Edition was announced on September 7, 2005. It was released in conjunction with the Harry Potter audiobooks in iTunes. It had a Hogwarts logo engraved on the back, and all six Harry Potter audiobooks which were available at the time preloaded.

iPod Photo

On October 26, 2004, in addition to the U2 edition, Apple also unveiled the iPod Photo. Positioned as a premium version of the standard fourth-generation iPod, the iPod Photo featured a 220×176-pixel LCD capable of displaying up to 65,536 colors. The device can be attached to a television or other external display for slideshows, thanks to a bundled composite cable which fits in the headphone port ("iPod AV cable"); it is also forwards compatible with then-future dock connector based composite and S-video accessories.
Photos are stored in a proprietary database, which iTunes can generate from JPEG, BMP, GIF, TIFF, and PNG file formats sourced from either a folder, from Apple's iPhoto on the Macintosh, Adobe Photoshop Album 2.0 or Photoshop Elements 3.0 on Windows. Battery life was rated 15 hours for music playback and 5 hours for slideshows with music.

On February 23, 2005, both 40 GB models (photo and regular) were replaced with a slimmer and lower-priced 30GB photo model leaving only a 20 GB black-and-white iPod left. On the same day, Apple announced the iPod Camera Connector which allowed instant transfer of images from a USB-compatible digital camera to the iPod Photo. The main difference between this and Belkin's Digital Camera Link was that Apple's unit supported instant image viewing on the iPod Photo after transfer without having to connect the iPod Photo to a computer first.

iPod with color display
On June 28, 2005, just nine months after its introduction, the iPod Photo was merged with the rest of the iPod line. The 30 GB model was dropped, and the 20 GB monochrome iPod received a color screen.

5th generation ("iPod Video")

The fifth-generation iPod was introduced on October 12, 2005, shortly after the introduction of the iPod Nano. The fifth-generation iPod featured a 2.5" 320×240 QVGA screen and a smaller Click Wheel. It was the first iPod to be able to play videos.

The fifth-generation iPod, sometimes colloquially known as the iPod Video, is the first iPod to be available in an alternative color scheme in a non-special-edition form, as a black option was added alongside "Signature iPod White", and marked the second full redesign of the iPod's aesthetic with its re-arranged proportions, its return to a fully flat front plate, and its more rounded rear casing. The 4-pin remote port was removed as well, causing backwards compatibility issues with certain accessories. The fifth-generation iPod was the last model to have a plastic face.

The fifth-generation iPod was updated on September 12, 2006; this model is officially known as "iPod (Late 2006)", and is unofficially referred to as "5th generation enhanced" and "5.5th generation". This update included a brighter screen, longer video playback time, improved video decoding hardware, newly designed earphones and a search feature. An iTunes installation CD was also no longer bundled, requiring users to download iTunes from Apple's website. Gapless playback and support for iPod games was enabled on all fifth-generation iPods through a firmware update released at the same time.

The fifth-generation iPod plays video in MPEG-4 (up to 480p 2.5 Mbit/s) and H.264 (up to 240p, 768 kbit/s, baseline profile level 1.3 only) formats.
The enhanced fifth-generation iPod, as well as firmware 1.2 for its predecessor, upgrade H.264 support to 480p 1.5 Mbit/s.
As is the case for music, video content such as TV shows, podcasts, music videos, and movies may be purchased from the iTunes Store (with DRM, with rental options launched later), or sourced externally and imported via iTunes.

Videos or photo slideshows may be played from the fifth-generation iPod on a television set, projector or monitor with the use of the Apple Composite AV cable or via an older dock providing an S-Video output. It is also possible to obtain composite video from the headphone jack, using an iPod AV Cable or generic equivalent (appropriately wired TRRS minijack), a feature removed from the following generation.

6th generation

During a special iPod marketing event on September 5, 2007, Steve Jobs introduced the sixth-generation iPod and the suffix "Classic", which distinguished it from the new iPod Touch based on the design of the iPhone. Featuring slightly thinner bodies, the sixth-generation iPod also had dramatically improved battery life, claiming up to 36 hours of music playback and 6 hours of video playback. The iPod Classic has a 2.5" backlit display at a resolution of 320×240. The front plate was made of anodized aluminium instead of polycarbonate plastic, and "Signature iPod White" was replaced by silver. The sixth-generation iPod also introduced a completely overhauled user interface, incorporating more graphics and Cover Flow. The iPod Classic was offered in an 80 GB model for MSRP  and a 160 GB model for MSRP ; this capacity distinguished it from the iPod Touch, which was limited to 32 GB.

The 160 GB hard drive is not fully ATA compatible, not supporting 48-bit LBA in favor of a proprietary addressing method; neither is LBA48 supported by the Apple-supplied operating system, inconveniencing people interested in upgrading the internal storage.
Video playback specifications also received an upgrade over the previous generation, with further improvements to H.264 decoding (advertised up to 640x480p, baseline profile level 3.0, 2.5 Mbps bitrate; actual capabilities up to 720x576 at 5 Mbps with caveats) as well as supporting the Apple Component AV Cable with progressive scan, but removes support for cables without an authentication chip and those connecting to the headphone port.

Revisions

It introduced Genius and full support for TRRS headsets with remote and mic, which are also available in other iPod models released at similar times; no firmware update provides either feature to the 2007 iPods. Also, the black model's faceplate was replaced with a gray colored faceplate, while retaining the silver backing and the black Click Wheel.

During the event, Apple replaced the 120 GB version with a 160 GB model, featuring the same slim profile of the 80 GB and 120 GB models. This model is sometimes colloquially known as the "7th generation", especially amongst the iPod community (despite it only offering few new features such as Genius Mixes, as well as supporting 48-bit sector numbers).

Special editions

U2 Special Editions 
There are four different U2 Special Edition iPod models, each with widely differing capabilities. However, each of the U2 models—the iPod U2 (4th Gen), iPod U2 (Color), iPod U2 (5th Gen/Video), and iPod U2 (5th Gen Enhanced)  are the same internally as the "standard" iPod model available at the time, and the U2 models vary only in case design and cost.

The iPod U2 (4th Gen) 

The original U2 iPod—the iPod U2 (4th Gen)  is internally the same as the 20 GB configuration of the iPod (4th Generation), but uses a case with a black front, a red Click Wheel, and laser-etched signatures of the U2 band members on the stainless steel back. It shipped with an "exclusive" U2 poster, a -off coupon for "The Complete U2" downloadable "box set", and the standard white iPod earbuds. It cost  more than the standard iPod (4th Gen).

The iPod U2 (Color) 

The second U2 iPod—the iPod U2 (Color)—is internally identical to the 20 GB configuration of the iPod (with Color Display). It uses a slightly thicker (.06 inches) version of the original U2 iPod case, complete with black front, red Click Wheel, and laser-etched signatures from the band members on a stainless-steel back, but it most notably adds a color display. It also shipped with the same poster, coupon, and earbuds, but only cost  more than the standard iPod (with Color Display).

The U2 (5th Gen & 5th Gen Enhanced)  
The third and fourth U2 Special Edition iPods—the iPod U2 (5th Gen/Video), and iPod U2 (5th Gen Enhanced)—are internally identical to the iPod Fifth Generation (with Video) and iPod Fifth Generation (Enhanced), respectively, but each cost  more than the standard models. Externally, both have a red Click Wheel and a "gloss black metal" rear case (featuring laser-etched autographs of the U2 band members like the other U2 models).

Discontinuation

According to speculation by Wired, the 6th generation was, as of 2014, expected to be the final form of the iPod Classic that helped Apple achieve its success in the 2000s. Ars Technica speculated in 2011 that the iPod Classic was nearing its end, and the site's readers generally agreed it would not still be produced in 2013. The Apple Worldwide Developers Conference in 2013 revealed no new iPod Classic, and Apple was not expected to produce another one. Production of the iPod Classic continued in low volumes as a stop-gap measure to clear out and monetize inventory of unused stand-alone parts.

On September 9, 2014, Apple officially discontinued the iPod Classic. The sixth-generation 160 GB iPod Classic was the last Apple product in the iPod line to use the original 30-pin iPod connector and the Click Wheel. According to Tim Cook speaking at WSJD Live, the iPod Classic was discontinued because the parts were unavailable and a redesign was unwarranted given the small amount of consumer interest in the product.

Models

Timeline of full-size iPod models

Sources: Apple press release library, Mactracker Apple Inc. model database

References

External links

 

Classic
Products introduced in 2001
Products and services discontinued in 2014
Portable media players
ITunes
Digital audio players
Discontinued Apple Inc. products